Jean-Claude Moraux (born 1 April 1951) is a Belgian field hockey player. He competed at the 1972 Summer Olympics and the 1976 Summer Olympics.

References

External links
 

1951 births
Living people
Belgian male field hockey players
Olympic field hockey players of Belgium
Field hockey players at the 1972 Summer Olympics
Field hockey players at the 1976 Summer Olympics
People from Schaerbeek
Field hockey players from Brussels